The Territory of Papua comprised the southeastern quarter of the island of New Guinea from 1883 to 1975. In 1883, the Government of Queensland annexed this territory for the British Empire. The United Kingdom Government refused to ratify the annexation but in 1884 a protectorate was proclaimed over the territory, then called "British New Guinea". There is a certain ambiguity about the exact date on which the entire territory was annexed by the British. The Papua Act 1905 recites that this happened "on or about" 4 September 1888. On 18 March 1902, the Territory was placed under the authority of the Commonwealth of Australia. Resolutions of acceptance were passed by the Commonwealth Parliament, which accepted the territory under the name of Papua.

In 1949, the Territory and the Territory of New Guinea were established in an administrative union by the name of the Territory of Papua and New Guinea. That administrative union was renamed as Papua New Guinea in 1971. Notwithstanding that it was part of an administrative union, the Territory of Papua at all times retained a distinct legal status and identity; it was a Possession of the Crown whereas the Territory of New Guinea was initially a League of Nations mandate territory and subsequently a United Nations trust territory. This legal and political distinction remained until the advent of the Independent State of Papua New Guinea in 1975.

Papua made up the southern half of what is today Papua New Guinea and contained the territory's capital, Port Moresby, which then became the capital of the independent country.

History

Background
Archeological evidence suggests that humans arrived on New Guinea at least 60,000 years ago. These Melanesian people developed stone tools and agriculture. Portuguese and Spanish navigators sailing in the South Pacific entered New Guinea waters in the early part of the 16th century and in 1526–27, Don Jorge de Meneses came upon the principal island, which the locals called "Papua". In 1545, the Spaniard Íñigo Ortiz de Retez gave the island the name "New Guinea", because he saw a resemblance between the islands' inhabitants and those found on the African region of Guinea. European knowledge of the interior of the island remained scant for several centuries after these initial encounters.

Annexation

In 1883 Sir Thomas McIlwraith, the Premier of Queensland, ordered Henry Chester (1832–1914), the police magistrate on Thursday Island, to proceed to Port Moresby and annex New Guinea and adjacent islands as to counter the expansion of German New Guinea in the name of the British government. Chester made the proclamation on 4 April 1883, but the British government repudiated the action which angered the Australian colonies.

On 6 November 1884, after the Australian colonies had promised financial support, the territory became a British protectorate. On 4 September 1888 the protectorate was annexed by Britain, together with some adjacent islands, which were collectively named British New Guinea. In 1902, the British parts of Papua were effectively transferred to the authority of the new Dominion of Australia. With the passage of the Papua Act 1905, the area was officially renamed the Territory of Papua, and Australian administration formally began in 1906.

Meanwhile, the northern part of New Guinea was under German commercial control from 1884, and from 1899 was directly ruled by the German government as the colony of German New Guinea, then known as Kaiser-Wilhelmsland. At the outbreak of the First World War in 1914, Australia invaded Kaiser-Wilhelmsland on 11 September 1914 with 2000 volunteers of the Australian Naval and Military Expeditionary Force. After several skirmishes, the Australians succeeded in capturing the German colony, which they occupied for the rest of the war. The Treaty of Versailles in 1919 transferred German New Guinea to Australia, which administered it as the Territory of New Guinea.

World War II

Shortly after the start of the Pacific War, the island of New Guinea was invaded by the Japanese. Papua was the least affected region. Most of West Papua, at that time known as Dutch New Guinea, was occupied, as were large parts of the Territory of New Guinea (the former German New Guinea, which was also under Australian rule after World War I), but Papua was protected to a large extent by its southern location and the near-impassable Owen Stanley Ranges to the north. Civil administration was suspended during the war and both territories (Papua and New Guinea) were placed under martial law for the duration.

The New Guinea campaign opened with the battles for New Britain and New Ireland in the Territory of New Guinea in 1942. Rabaul, the capital of the Territory, was overwhelmed on 22–23 January and was established as a major Japanese base from where the Japanese landed on mainland New Guinea and advanced towards Port Moresby and Australia. Having had their initial effort to capture Port Moresby by a seaborne invasion disrupted by the U.S. Navy and Australian navy in the Battle of the Coral Sea, the Japanese attempted a landward attack from the north via the Kokoda Track. From July 1942, a few Australian reserve battalions, many of them very young and untrained, fought a stubborn rearguard action against the Japanese attack, over the rugged Owen Stanley Ranges. The militia, worn out and severely depleted by casualties, held out with the assistance of Papuan porters and medical assistants, and were relieved in late August by regular troops from the Second Australian Imperial Force, returning from action in the Mediterranean Theatre.

In early September 1942 Japanese marines attacked a strategic Royal Australian Air Force base at Milne Bay, near the eastern tip of Papua. They were beaten back by the Australian Army, and the Battle of Milne Bay was the first outright defeat of Japanese land forces during World War II. The offensives in Papua and New Guinea of 1943–44 were the single largest series of connected operations ever mounted by the Australian armed forces. The Supreme Commander of operations was the United States General Douglas Macarthur, with Australian General Thomas Blamey taking a direct role in planning, and operations being essentially directed by staff at New Guinea Force headquarters in Port Moresby. Bitter fighting continued in New Guinea between the largely Australian force and the Japanese 18th Army based in New Guinea until the Japanese surrender in 1945.

Administrative unification with New Guinea
After the war, the Papua and New Guinea Act 1949 united the Territory of Papua and the Territory of New Guinea as the Territory of Papua and New Guinea. However, for the purposes of Australian nationality a distinction was maintained between the two territories. The act provided for a Legislative Council (which was established in 1951), a judicial organization, a public service, and a system of local government.

Under Australian Minister for External Territories Andrew Peacock, the territory adopted self-government in 1972 and on 15 September 1975, during the term of the Whitlam Government in Australia, the Territory became the independent nation of Papua New Guinea.

See also

 List of colonial heads of Papua
Hiri Motu
 History of Papua New Guinea
History of Queensland
History of Australia

References

 
States and territories disestablished in 1975
Territory of Papua
History of the foreign relations of Australia
Australian External Territories
Australia–Papua New Guinea relations
Former British colonies and protectorates in Oceania
1884 establishments in the British Empire
1884 establishments in Oceania